Ranks of the RAF may refer to:
RAF officer ranks, for commissioned officers
RAF other ranks, for other (i.e. enlisted) ranks